The 2005–06 Virginia Cavaliers men's basketball team represented the University of Virginia during the 2005–06 NCAA Division I men's basketball season. The team was led by first-year head coach Dave Leitao, and played their home games at University Hall in Charlottesville, Virginia as members of the Atlantic Coast Conference.

This was the final season Virginia played at University Hall, as the John Paul Jones Arena opened for the 2006–07 season.

Last season
The Cavaliers had a record of 14–15, with a conference record of 4–12. At the end of the season, head coach Pete Gillen stepped down from the position. On April 16, DePaul head coach Dave Leitao was announced to take over at Virginia.

Roster

Schedule 

|-
!colspan=9 style="background:#00214e; color:#f56d22;"| Exhibition game

|-
!colspan=9 style="background:#00214e; color:#f56d22;"| Regular season

|-
!colspan=9 style="background:#00214e; color:#f56d22;"| ACC Tournament

|-
!colspan=9 style="background:#00214e; color:#f56d22;"| National Invitation Tournament

References

Virginia
Virginia Cavaliers men's basketball seasons
Virginia
2005 in sports in Virginia
2006 in sports in Virginia